Yoandris Salinas (born September 20, 1985) is a Cuban professional boxer from Ciego de Ávila best known to medal repeatedly at flyweight in international amateur tournaments.

Amateur
Salinas sensationally lost in 2005 to 16-year-old Rosniel Iglesias but beat Andry Laffita 2006 and 2007 at the National championships and therefore represented Cuba at the 2006 Central American and Caribbean Games where he lost the final (6:5) to Dominican Juan Carlos Payano.

In 2006 he won a tournament called "Cuban Olympics" by edging out (smaller) junior flyweight superstar Zou Shiming in the final.

At the Pan American Games 2007 he lost due to head injury to eventual winner McWilliams Arroyo.

In 2008 he tried the bantamweight division at the national championships but lost early to Osieres Hernández.
In this division he now has Olympic silver medalist Yankiel León in front of him.

Professional
He turned professional in 2009 at junior-featherweight. He won 20 of his first 21 contests, the only blemish on his record being a draw against Nehomar Cermeno in Panama City in October 2011. He faced Scott Quigg for the WBA super-bantamweight championship in Manchester on 28 September 2013. The fight resulted in a draw.

Professional boxing record

| style="text-align:center;" colspan="8"|20 Wins (13 knockouts, 7 decisions),  1 Losses, 2 Draws
|-
|align=center style="border-style: none none solid solid; background: #e3e3e3"|Res.
|align=center style="border-style: none none solid solid; background: #e3e3e3"|Record
|align=center style="border-style: none none solid solid; background: #e3e3e3"|Opponent
|align=center style="border-style: none none solid solid; background: #e3e3e3"|Type
|align=center style="border-style: none none solid solid; background: #e3e3e3"|Round
|align=center style="border-style: none none solid solid; background: #e3e3e3"|Date
|align=center style="border-style: none none solid solid; background: #e3e3e3"|Location
|align=center style="border-style: none none solid solid; background: #e3e3e3"|Notes
|- align=center
|Loss
|20–1–2
|align=left| Enrique Quevedo	
|
|
|
|align=left|
|align=left|
|- align=center
|Draw
|20–0–2
|align=left| Scott Quigg
|
|
|
|align=left|
|align=left|
|- align=center
|Win
|20–0–1
|align=left| Eliecer Lanzas
|
|
|
|align=left|
|align=left|
|- align=center
|Win
|19–0–1
|align=left| Jose Anibal Cruz
|
|
|
|align=left|
|align=left|
|- align=center
|Win
|18–0–1
|align=left| Geyci Lorenzo
|
|
|
|align=left|
|align=left|
|- align=center
|Win
|17–0–1
|align=left| Imer Velasquez
|
|
|
|align=left|
|align=left|
|- align=center
|Win
|16–0–1
|align=left| Bismarck Alfaro
|
|
|
|align=left|
|align=left|
|- align=center
|Win
|15–0–1
|align=left| Danny Erazo
|
|
|
|align=left|
|align=left|
|- align=center
|Win
|14–0–1
|align=left| Aneudy Matos
|
|
|
|align=left|
|align=left|
|- align=center
|Draw
|13–0–1
|align=left| Nehomar Cermeno
|
|
|
|align=left|
|align=left|
|- align=center
|Win
|13–0
|align=left| Felipe Almanza
|
|
|
|align=left|
|align=left|
|- align=center
|Win
|12–0
|align=left| Carlos Rivas
|
|
|
|align=left|
|align=left|
|- align=center
|Win
|11–0
|align=left| Jhon Alberto Molina
|
|
|
|align=left|
|align=left|
|- align=center
|Win
|10–0
|align=left| Javier Castro
|
|
|
|align=left|
|align=left|
|- align=center
|Win
|9–0
|align=left| Robert DaLuz
|
|
|
|align=left|
|align=left|
|- align=center
|Win
|8–0
|align=left| Leshaun Blair
|
|
|
|align=left|
|align=left|
|- align=center
|Win
|7–0
|align=left| David Green
|
|
|
|align=left|
|align=left|
|- align=center
|Win
|6–0
|align=left| Ivan Moxey	
|
|
|
|align=left|
|align=left|
|- align=center
|Win
|5–0
|align=left| Angel Lopez	
|
|
|
|align=left|
|align=left|
|- align=center
|Win
|4–0
|align=left| Danny Aquino 	
|
|
|
|align=left|
|align=left|
|- align=center
|Win
|3–0
|align=left| Jesse Padilla 	
|
|
|
|align=left|
|align=left|
|- align=center
|Win
|2–0
|align=left| Yuniel Ramos 	
|
|
|
|align=left|
|align=left|
|- align=center
|Win
|1–0
|align=left| Felix Flores	
|
|
|
|align=left|
|align=left|

External links
2006 Caribbean Games
2007 PanAm Games
Pro record

Living people
Flyweight boxers
1985 births
Boxers at the 2007 Pan American Games
Cuban male boxers
Pan American Games bronze medalists for Cuba
Pan American Games medalists in boxing
Central American and Caribbean Games silver medalists for Cuba
Competitors at the 2006 Central American and Caribbean Games
Central American and Caribbean Games medalists in boxing
Medalists at the 2007 Pan American Games
People from Ciego de Ávila
21st-century Cuban people
20th-century Cuban people